Summer Fields School is a private, co-educational, nursery–secondary school in the Kailash Colony neighbourhood of the South Delhi district of Delhi, India. It was established in 1953 by James Douglas Tytler and was a part of the K.R. Mangalam Group. It is affiliated to the Central Board of Secondary Education and is a member of the National Progressive Schools' Conference.

History 
After 1947 DLF Universal began developing the residential areas of south Delhi. During the development of Kailash Colony, to attract people to come and live in this part of Delhi, DLF approached Rev. James Douglas Tytler, an educationist, to start a school in the area.

He also started the first Delhi Public School (Naveen Bharat School) and Church High School. His work with the refugees was commended by the then Prime Minister of India, Pandit Jawahar Lal Nehru. Later on, he and Dr. Zakir Hussain, who was a teacher then, became great friends. His son Jagdish Tytler was the first student to be enrolled in the school.

House system

Junior 
Students of class III, IV and V are grouped into six houses:
 Vivekananda
 Nehru
 Gandhi
 Teresa
 Tagore
 Radhakrishnan

Each house is headed by a chief warden with 3-4 wardens. Each house is assigned duties to take care of discipline of the school once in each term. There is one boy and girl captain of each house who assist chief warden/wardens of their respective houses in maintaining discipline during assembly time, break time and at the time of departure.

House on duty takes care of Morning Talk and General Topics during the assembly.

Senior 
There are 6 houses in the Senior School:.
 Gandhi
 Tagore
 Radhakrishnan
 Teresa
 Vivekananda
 Nehru

Every student on admission is placed in one of these houses.

Each house is headed by one boy and one girl known as house captains who are assisted by house prefects and junior house prefects. A member of the staff assisted by several other teachers acts as the house warden. Each house is on duty for a month. Points are awarded to the house on the basis of display boards, maintenance of discipline, news, thoughts etc. Inter House competitions are organised throughout the year. At the end of the year the house gaining the highest number of points receives the inter-house running trophy "Lakysha".

Based on the academic performance of the students of each house, the inter-house running trophy ‘Vigya’ is awarded.

References

External links 
 

Private schools in Delhi